Betty in Search of a Thrill is a lost 1915 American silent adventure film that was directed by Phillips Smalley and Lois Weber and written by Elsie Janis. The film stars Elsie Janis, Owen Moore, Juanita Hansen, Herbert Standing, Vera Lewis, and Harry Ham. The film was released on May 17, 1915, by Paramount Pictures.

Plot

Cast 
Elsie Janis as Betty
Owen Moore as Jim Denning
Juanita Hansen as June Hastings
Herbert Standing as Mr. Hastings
Vera Lewis as Mrs. Hastings
Harry Ham as A Boarder
Roberta Hickman as Maizie Folette

References

External links 
 
 
 Lobby poster to the film under its alternative UK title The Merry Madcap

1915 films
American adventure films
1915 adventure films
Paramount Pictures films
Films directed by Lois Weber
American black-and-white films
American silent feature films
Lost American films
Lost adventure films
1915 lost films
1910s English-language films
1910s American films
Silent adventure films